Marcos Paulo Segobe da Silva, better known as Careca (born October 30, 1980 in Tambaú), is a Brazilian footballer who plays as a defensive midfielder.

Career

He gained some recognition in Coritiba, working for a year, but year after year passed and is in Guaratinguetá years in Ceara.

Contract
 Ceará.

References

External links
ogol.com.br

1980 births
Brazilian footballers
Living people
Association football midfielders
Grêmio Foot-Ball Porto Alegrense players
Grêmio Esportivo Brasil players
Canoas Sport Club players
Coritiba Foot Ball Club players
Guaratinguetá Futebol players
Ceará Sporting Club players
Fortaleza Esporte Clube players
Red Bull Brasil players
Guarani FC players